Ischanacanthiformes is a prehistoric order of Acanthodii or spiny sharks found in Canada, Ukraine and United Kingdom. Members of this order were nektonic carnivores, eating animals that swim rather than plankton. They had slender builds, light armor, deeply inserted spines, shark-like teeth, and two dorsal fins.  Some species were around 2 meters (6.56 feet) long. It was described by Berg in 1940.

References

Acanthodii
Prehistoric fish orders